The 1734 Tradition is a form of traditional witchcraft founded by the American Joseph Bearwalker Wilson in 1973, after developing it since 1964. It is largely based upon the teachings he received from an English traditional witch named Robert Cochrane, the founder of Cochrane's Craft, and from Ruth Wynn-Owen, whom he called the matriarch of Y Plant Bran ("the child of Bran").

References

External links
 1734 Witchcraft: The Authentic Method of Robert Cochrane and Joseph Bearwalker Wilson

Modern witchcraft
Wicca in the United States
1970s in modern paganism